In ancient Rome, a tintinnabulum (less often tintinnum) was a wind chime or assemblage of bells. A tintinnabulum often took the form of a bronze ithyphallic figure or of a fascinum, a magico-religious phallus thought to ward off the evil eye and bring good fortune and prosperity.

A tintinnabulum acted as a door amulet. These were hung near thresholds at a shop or house, under the peristyles (around the inner courtyard or garden) by the bedroom, or the venereum, where the wind would cause them to tinkle. They were also made to ring like doorbells, a series of them being tied to cord attached to a bell pull.

The sounds of bells were believed to keep away evil spirits; compare the apotropaic role of the bell in the "bell, book, and candle" ritual of the earlier Catholic Church. It has also been surmised that oscilla hung on hooks along colonnaded porticoes may have comparable evil-warding intents.

Hand-bells have been found in sanctuaries and other settings that indicate their religious usage, and were used at the Temple of Iuppiter Tonans, "Jupiter the Thunderer." Elaborately decorated pendants for tintinnabula occur in Etruscan settings, depicting for example women carding wool, spinning, and weaving. Bells were hung on the necks of domestic animals such as horses and sheep to keep track of the animals, but perhaps also for apotropaic purposes.

A number of examples are part of the Secret Museum collection at the Museo Archeologico Nazionale di Napoli.

See also
Erotic art in Pompeii and Herculaneum
Lucky Charms (disambiguation)
Mutunus Tutunus
Priapus
Sexuality in ancient Rome

References
Citations

Sources

Further reading
Sex or symbol: erotic images of Greece and Rome by Catherine Johns, The British Museum Press (1982) 
Eros in Pompeii: the erotic art collection of the Museum of Naples by Michael Grant, Antonia Mulas, Museo nazionale di Napoli (1997)
The Roman cultural revolution by Thomas N. Habinek, Alessandro Schiesaro (1997) p. 171

External links

 Highlights from the British Museum: Lion-phallus, winged phallus, diphallic figure
 Metropolitan Museum of Art: Bronze phallic ornament

Lucky symbols
Amulets
Bells (percussion)
Ancient Roman erotic art
Phallic symbols
Ancient Roman metalwork